Hillhurst is an extinct town in Pierce County, in the U.S. state of Washington.

A post office called Hillhurst was established in 1878, and remained in operation until 1920. The community was named for a hill near the original town site.

References

Ghost towns in Washington (state)
Geography of Pierce County, Washington